Magoulas is a Greek surname. Notable people with the surname include:

Thimistokles Magoulas (born 1927), Greek sailor
Yiorgos Magoulas (born 1970), Greek composer, conductor, and guitarist

Greek-language surnames